The 3rd Singapore Division (3 DIV) is a combined arms division of the Singapore Army.

History 
The 3rd Division was formed on 31 August 1970 with six units under its command, which was then known as Area III Command HQ. On 1 May 1976, Area III Command was redesignated as the 3rd Singapore Infantry Division. It became the Singapore Army's first combined arms division on 21 March 1991 and has since been known as the 3rd Singapore Division. On 4 January 1995, the 3rd Division was reorganised to include both active and reservist units. In December 2004, after the drawdown of the 1st People's Defence Force, the 3rd Division took command of the 1st People's Defence Force's former units.

References 

 

Singapore Army
Formations of the Singapore Army
Military units and formations established in 1970